Indonesia and Suriname established diplomatic relations in 1975. Both had a special relationship, based upon shared common history as former colonies of the Dutch Empire. Large numbers of Javanese migrated to Suriname to work on plantations during the late 19th and early 20th-centuries. Indonesia has an embassy in Paramaribo also accredited to the Co-operative Republic of Guyana, while Suriname has an embassy in Jakarta. Indonesia and Suriname are members of the World Trade Organization (WTO) and Forum of East Asia-Latin America Cooperation.

History

The historical links between Indonesia and Suriname dating back to the migration of Indonesians (especially Javanese) to Suriname in 1890. During colonial Dutch East Indies in 19th-century, to fulfill labor need in its other colonies, the Dutch began to send large numbers of Javanese to work in Suriname. Most of them works in plantation and agriculture sectors. Today, there is around 70,000 citizen or 15 percent of Suriname's demographic have Javanese descent, and some of its officials, such as cabinet ministers are Javanese. Bilateral diplomatic relations were officially established in 1975, although there had been an Indonesian Consulate General in Paramaribo since 1964.

Economy and trade
Indonesia sees Suriname as a strategic partner in the region, as its gate and trade hub to enter the Latin America market. The volume of bilateral trade in 2012, reached US$8.9 million in favour to Indonesia. In 2012 Indonesia's exports to Suriname was $7.1 million while imports was $1.8 million, resulting in $5.3 million surplus in trade balances for Indonesia. Indonesia sells textile, furniture, clothes, household equipments, plastic equipments, shoes, cooking ingredients and musical instruments to Suriname.

Culture
Indonesian's Yogyakarta and Suriname's Commewijne, signed sister cities agreement on 4 April 2011. The common Javanese culture among Javanese Indonesian and Javanese Surinamese also bridges the common cultural and historical links between two countries.

See also
Netherlands Antilles 
Javanese Surinamese
Afro-Surinamese people
Javanese (Indonesians)
Queen Juliana of Holland
Dutch Indonesians
Dutch-based creole language
Indonesia–Netherlands relations 
Netherlands-Suriname relations
Surinamese people in the Netherlands

Notes

External links
Embassy of Indonesia in Paramaribo, Suriname

 
Suriname
Bilateral relations of Suriname